Dasvandh (also transcribed as daswandh) is the one tenth part (or 10%) of one's income that one should donate, both financially (as a tithe) and directly in the form of seva, according to Sikh principles.

It falls into Guru Nanak Dev's concept of Vand Chhako. This was done during the time of Guru Arjan Dev and many Sikhs still do it up to this day. The concept of dasvandh was implicit in Guru Nanak's own line: "ghali khai kichhu hathhu dei, Nanak rahu pachhanahi sei—He alone, O Nanak, knoweth the way who eats out of what he earneth by his honest labour and yet shareth part of it with others" (GG, 1245). The idea of sharing and giving was nourished by the institutions of sangat (holy assembly) and langar (community kitchen) the Guru had established.

History 
In the time of Guru Amar Das, a formal structure for organising the Sikh religion was developed in order to show directions to the Sikhs by preaching them the teachings of The Holy Guru. He set up 22 manjis or districts in different parts of the country. Each of these manjis was placed under the charge of a pious Sikh (both male and female) who, besides preaching Guru Nanak’s word, looked after the sangats within his/her jurisdiction and transmitted the disciple's offerings to the Guru. As the excavation of the sacred tank at Amritsar, and the erection of the central shrine, Harimandir, began under Guru Ram Das resulting in a large amount of expenditure, the Sikhs were encouraged to set aside a minimum of ten per cent (dasvandh) of their income for the common cause and the concept of Guru Ki Golak "Guru's treasury" was coined. Masands, i.e. ministers and the tithe-collectors, were appointed to collect "kar bhet" (seva offerings) and dasvandh from the Sikhs in the area they were assigned to, and pass these on to the Guru nanak.

The custom of dasvandh is found in documents called rehitnamas, manuals of Sikh conduct, written during the lifetime of Guru Gobind Singh or soon after. For example, Bhai Nand Lal’s Tankhahnama records these words of Gobind Singh: "Hear ye Nand Lal, one who does not give dasvandh and, telling lies, misappropriates it, is not at all to be trusted". The tradition has been kept alive by chosen Sikhs who to this day scrupulously fulfil this injunction. The institution itself serves as a means for the individual to practice personal piety as well as to participate in the ongoing history of the community, the Guru Panth ("Guru's path").

See also 
 Zakat

References 

Sikh practices
History of Sikhism
Tithes